Oregostoma is a genus of beetles in the family Cerambycidae, containing the following species:

 Oregostoma bipartitum (Bates, 1873)
 Oregostoma nigripes Audinet-Serville, 1833
 Oregostoma nitidiventre (Gounelle, 1911)
 Oregostoma puniceum (Newman, 1838)

References

Rhinotragini